Andreu Capdevila i Puig (Cardedeu, Vallès Oriental, 25 December 1894 - Rennes, Brittany, 1987) was a Catalan trade unionist.

Biography
Andreu Capdevila i Puig was born in Cardedeu on 25 December 1894. As a child he moved to Sant Andreu de Palomar. At the age of 13 he began work as a dyer in the Fabra i Coats Spinning Company, while also participating in trade union actions. At the age of 20 he began to take on responsibilities at the CNT, he became leader of the CNT's Textile Union, and acted especially in Sant Andreu de Palomar.

After the outbreak of the Spanish Revolution of 1936, he assumed the position of Minister of Economy of the Generalitat de Catalunya, from 16 April to 5 May 1937, and then acted as President of the Economic Council. At the end of the Spanish Civil War, he went into exile in Perpignan, where he continued to agitate with the CNT, and regularly collaborated in the trade union newspapers Le Combat in Paris and L'Espoir in Toulouse. Supporter of the orthodox line and opposed to the Workers' Alliance and Defensa Interior, during the 60s he acted as secretary of the Aude-Pyrenees Relations Commission of the CNT in exile. He spent his last years in Rennes.

Works
 Un episodio de nuestra evacuación a Francia (1978).

References

1894 births
1987 deaths
Anarchists from Catalonia
Economy ministers of Catalonia